Kerth is a surname. Notable people with the surname include:

 Al Kerth (1952–2002), St. Louis civic leader and public relations executive
 Anna Kerth (born 1980), Polish actress 
 Werner Kerth (born 1966), Austrian ice hockey player

German-language surnames